Ratzlaff is a surname of German origin derived from the Slavic given name Ratislav, which is composed of the elements rad "joyful" and slav "glory" or "praise". The name may refer to:

Leonard Ratzlaff (born 1949), Canadian musician
Raymond Ratzlaff (born 1931), Canadian politician

References

See also
 
Retzlaff

German-language surnames
Surnames of Slavic origin